Hugh of Sully was a general under the Sicilian King Charles of Anjou. He was nicknamed "the Red" ("le Rousseau") on account of his red hair.

A Burgundian knight of fiery and haughty temperament, according to the chroniclers, Hugh was named Vicar-General of Charles' Kingdom of Albania in August 1279, and led the Sicilian forces in their unsuccessful attempt to take Berat from the Byzantine Empire in 1280–1281. Sully was taken prisoner in an ambush, whereupon his army scattered and suffered many losses to the pursuing Byzantines. He was then taken to Constantinople where he was paraded in the streets along with the other captives. Sully was eventually released after years in Byzantine captivity and returned to Italy.

References 

 Norwich, John Julius. Byzantium: The Decline and Fall (New York: Alfred A Kopf, 1996)

French prisoners of war in the 13th century
Vicars-General of the Kingdom of Albania
13th-century French people
Military history of the Kingdom of Sicily
Prisoners of war held by the Byzantine Empire
Italian prisoners of war
People from Burgundy (French region)
Charles I of Anjou